Conomelus is a genus of true bugs belonging to the family Delphacidae.

The genus was first described by Fieber in 1866.

The species of this genus are found in Europe.

Species include:
 Conomelus anceps (Germar, 1821)

References

Delphacidae